European Gymnastics is one of five continental unions that represents the interests of Europe in the International Gymnastics Federation ( or FIG). It was formed on 27 March 1982 as the European Union of Gymnastics ( or UEG) and adopted its current name on 1 April 2020.

Events 
European Gymnastics organises European Gymnastics Championships for each of the gymnastic disciplines.

Current

Defunct

Member federations 
, European Gymnastics consists of 50 member federations

Other

As of June 2021, the president of European Gymnastics, Farid Gayibov, was being investigated for his close association with Kamran Ramazanov, the CEO of the Azeri IT company SmartScoring. In 2017, Gayibov signed a service contract on behalf of European Gymnastics with SmartScoring for providing live scoring and video streaming services for certain European gymnastics competitions amidst the protests of a number of member federations of European Gymnastics. Despite millions of dollars in financing, SmartScoring provided poor coverage of the qualification rounds of the 2021 European Artistic Gymnastics Championships in Basel, Switzerland and the 2021 European Rhythmic Gymnastics Championships in Varna, Bulgaria. Notwithstanding any customer feedback, on June 3, 2021 Gayibov extended European Gymnastics‘ contract with SmartScoring until 2023.

After the 2022 Russian invasion of Ukraine, the International Gymnastics Federation (FIG) barred Russian athletes and officials, including judges. It also announced that "all FIG World Cup and World Challenge Cup events planned to take place in Russia ... are cancelled, and no other FIG events will be allocated to Russia ... until further notice." FIG also banned the Russian flag at its events.

References

External links
 

Gymnastics organizations
Gymnastics in Switzerland
Gym
International sports bodies based in Switzerland
Organisations based in Lausanne
1982 establishments in Europe
Sports organizations established in 1982